Mohamed Rutitinga (born 29 September 1959) is a Tanzanian long-distance runner. He competed in the men's 5000 metres at the 1984 Summer Olympics.

References

1959 births
Living people
Athletes (track and field) at the 1984 Summer Olympics
Tanzanian male long-distance runners
Olympic athletes of Tanzania
Place of birth missing (living people)